The 1st Annual Premios Juventud (Youth Awards) were broadcast by Univision on September 23, 2004.

Winners and nominees 
Marc Anthony and Thalía was the leading nominees, with 13 nominations each. Jennifer Lopez follows with 12 nominations in various categories.  Other artists receiving nominations include Luis Miguel with 11, Paulina Rubio and Ricky Martin with 9 each, and Colombian pop star Shakira with 6 nominations.

The night's biggest winners were Mexican superstar Thalía and Chayanne, with three statuettes. Other takers included Jennifer Lopez and popular Banda group Liberación, with two statuettes, baseball shortstop Alex Rodríguez, and Colombian idols Paulina Rubio and Juanes took home one award each.

Music

Fashion and Images

Movies

Pop Culture

Sports

Arrivals
 Akwid
 Aleks Syntek
 Alicia Villarreal
 Amelia Vega
 Ana Claudia Talancón
 Ana Torroja
 Aracely Arámbula
 Camila Sodi
 Carolina Tejera
 Cristián de la Fuente
 Eugenio Derbez
 Gael García Bernal
 Galilea Montijo
 Ivy Queen
 Jennifer Peña
 Jorge Campos
 José José
 José María Torre
 Juanes
 Julieta Venegas
 Kate del Castillo
 Kumbia Kings
 Laisha Wilkins
 Lili Estefan
 Myrka Dellanos
 Odalys García
 Paulina Rubio
 Pee Wee
 Rafael Amaya
 Rene Lavan
 Shalim
 Sofía Vergara
 Valentino Lanús

Performances
Ana Toroja — "Duele El Amor"
Ivy Queen and Gran Omar — "Chika Ideal"
Jennifer Peña — "Hasta El Fin Del Mundo"
Juanes — "Nada Valgo Sin Tu Amor"
Kumbia Kings — "Sabes A Chocolate"
Paulina Rubio — "Dame Otro Tequila"

References

Premios Juventud
Premios Juventud
Premios Juventud
Premios Juventud
Premios Juventud
Premios Juventud
Premios Juventud
2000s in Miami